is a Japanese former tennis player.

She played on the ITF Women's Circuit where she won four singles and 20 doubles titles.
In May 2011, Iijima reached her highest WTA singles ranking of 182. On 9 July 2007, she peaked at No. 151 in the WTA doubles rankings. She was coached by Kimiyo Hatanaka.

ITF Circuit finals

Singles: 10 (4–6)

Doubles: 36 (20–16)

External links
 
 

1982 births
Living people
Japanese female tennis players
People from Gunma Prefecture
20th-century Japanese women
21st-century Japanese women